Inniscarra GAA is a Gaelic Athletic Association club based in the parish of Inniscarra, County Cork, Ireland. The club fields Gaelic football, hurling and camogie teams in competitions organized by Cork GAA county board and the Muskerry divisional board.

Achievements
 Cork Senior Camogie Championship Winners (4) 2010, 2016, 2017, 2018
 Cork Senior Hurling Championship (0) Runners-Up 1891
 Cork Premier Intermediate Hurling Championship Winners (1) 2022
 Cork Intermediate Hurling Championship Runners-Up 1922, 1925, 1991, 2003
 Cork Junior Hurling Championship Winners (1) 1975  Runners-Up  1968
 Cork Minor A Hurling Championship Runners-Up 1992, 1994
 Cork Premier 2 Minor Football Championship  Runners-Up 2013
 Cork Minor A Football Championship Winners (2) 1995, 2003 Runners-Up 2012
 Cork Under-21 Hurling Championship Runners-Up 1988
 Cork Under-21 Football Championship Runners-Up 2001
 Mid Cork Junior A Hurling Championship Winners (9) 1935, 1941 (as Inniscarra Valley), 1942, 1945, 1947, 1965, 1968, 1975, 2020  Runners-Up 1937, 1953, 1956, 1957, 1966, 1969, 1970, 1982, 1983, 1985, 1992, 1996, 1997, 2009
 Mid Cork Junior A Football Championship Winners (1) 1989  Runners-Up 1941, 2015

Notable players
 John O'Callaghan 2014 All-Ireland Intermediate Hurling Championship winning captain 
 Ger Manley
 Pat McDonnell
 Seán O'Donoghue
 Tomás Ryan
 Finbarr Sheehan

References

Sources
 Inniscarra GAA website
 Club facebook page

Gaelic games clubs in County Cork
Gaelic football clubs in County Cork
Hurling clubs in County Cork